Colorado Heights University was a private university in Denver, Colorado. It was part of the Teikyo University Group. In July, 2009 it changed its name from Teikyo Loretto Heights University to Colorado Heights University. It opened in 1989 on the campus of the former Loretto Heights College and closed in 2016 due to declining enrollment.

History

At the end of the 19th century, Mother Pancratia (Mary Louise Bonfils 1852-1915), of the Sisters of Loretto, had the vision to educate women in the Rocky Mountain region. In 1886, Loretto Heights Academy was founded as a Catholic girls' high school in the building now used as Colorado Heights University's Administration Building.

The landmark Administration Building was a Romanesque six-story structure, designed by Denver architect Frank E. Edbrooke (1840-1921). The Administration Building was built from red sandstone and has been on the National Register of Historic Places since 1975.

Over the years, the school became a college and expanded to include teacher education programs, nursing programs, business, dance and more for both men and women. The campus now has almost 20 structures, including a 1,000-seat theater, an interfaith chapel, a swimming pool, cafeteria, residence halls and recreational amenities.

In 1989, Teikyo Loretto Heights University (TLHU) opened on the campus of the former Loretto Heights College. TLHU focused on international students. In 2009, Colorado Heights University opened. Colorado Heights University was owned by the Teikyo University Group, a multinational educational foundation based in Japan that operates many undergraduate and graduate universities with more than 70,000 students spread across 46 campuses world-wide.

Academics
Colorado Heights University focused on interdisciplinary business degree programs and English as a Second Language (ESL) courses. It offered Intensive English and Test of English as a Foreign Language (TOEFL) preparation certificate programs, the Bachelor of Arts in International Business, and various specializations in the Master of Business Administration in International Business.

Campus
Its campus had consisted of 20 buildings on a  site, the highest area in Denver. The Administration Building opened in 1891. Its prominent bell tower could be seen from miles around, serving as a landmark for many Denver residents.

Students
Most of the students at Colorado Heights University were non-traditional college students. This demographic includes international students, students who speak a language other than English as their native tongue.

In addition to the diversity of languages, those students also represented a diversity of cultures, religion and educational backgrounds. In fact, current and past students came to Colorado Heights University from more than 60 countries from Europe, Africa, Asia and the Americas.

References

Sisters of Loretto schools
Universities and colleges in Denver
Educational institutions established in 1989
Defunct private universities and colleges in Colorado
1989 establishments in Colorado
Educational institutions disestablished in 2017
2017 disestablishments in Colorado
History of women in Colorado